The Wiltshire Historic Buildings Trust (founded in 1967, sometimes abbreviated WHBT) is a charitable organisation which works to preserve the architectural heritage of Wiltshire, in the West of England.

History

The Trust was formed in 1967, its purpose being "to preserve property and buildings of architectural and historical interest in the county for the benefit of the nation". It is both a registered charity and a company limited by guarantee.

The money employed by the Trust originated in a single grant made at the time of its foundation by the former Wiltshire County Council, funding which has been described by the Trust's President Lord Lansdowne as "a revolving capital sum".

Since 1967, the Trust has been instrumental in a number of projects for the restoration and conversion of historic buildings large and small. At the end of a project, the restored building is sold, so that the Trust can recover the money laid out and look for a new project.

The restoration projects of the charity have included the following buildings: Barton Farm, Bradford on Avon (sold 1975); Number 23, South Wraxall (sold 1982); Wilton Windmill, near Marborough (completed 1976); Number 3, High Street, Marlborough; Numbers 7, 9, 11, 13, 15, 21, 23 and 25, Church Street, Calne (1987–1992); The Well House, Derry Hill (2002–2003); The Ostler's House, at the Hare and Hounds public house, Pickwick (2003–2004); The Apple Store, Rowdeford School (2006); and The Granary, Manor Farm, Yatesbury (2006–2007).

Given its planned nature as a revolving fund, the articles of association of the Trust prevent it from making grants to private owners of historic buildings, but it has sometimes made contributions to special projects around Wiltshire promoted by others. A loan was made to the Merchant's House Trust in Marlborough to enable it to buy the burgage plot associated with the Merchant's House. Grants have included one to the Warminster Buildings Preservation Trust for a town centre project, another to the Friends of Lydiard Park to help with the restoration of an ice house in the grounds of that country house (a project completed in 2007), and a contribution was made to the Salisbury Cathedral Appeal.

The Trust is a member of the Association of Preservation Trusts.

Devizes Assize Courts 

After becoming redundant in the 1980s, the Grade II* listed former assize court building – built in 1835, in Grecian style using Bath stone to designs of T. H. Wyatt – stood unused. The Trust assisted Kennet District Council with a study in 2006–7, and in 2018 supported the establishment of Devizes Assize Court Trust, a charity which bought the building and aims to restore it to provide a new home for Wiltshire Museum.

Personnel

Presidents
1967–1975: John Morrison, 1st Baron Margadale
1975–1994: The Countess of Radnor OBE DL
1994 to date: 9th Marquess of Lansdowne (as Earl of Shelburne, 1994–1997)

Chairmen
1967–1976: Sir Geoffrey Tritton, 3rd Bt.
1976–1980: Mrs B. G. Sykes
1980–1986: Dr T. K. Maurice OBE
1986–2016: Mr G. F. McDonic MBE
2017– : Mr John Barnard Bush

Governors
The Trustees are known as 'Governors'. Four are appointed by the Wiltshire Council unitary authority, and one by the Borough of Swindon; other new Governors are appointed by the existing Governors of the Trust.

See also
Society for the Protection of Ancient Buildings
Somerset Buildings Preservation Trust

References

Colin Johns, Wiltshire Historic Buildings Trust 1967–2007 (2007)

External links 

Buildings and structures in Wiltshire
Charities based in Wiltshire
Heritage organisations in England
1967 establishments in England
Building Preservation Trusts